Balsiai is a village in Kėdainiai district municipality, Kaunas County, central Lithuania. According to the 2011 census, only 1 person lives in the village. It is located 3.5 km from Gudžiūnai and is by the Mairiškiai-Gudžiūnai road.

Demography

References

Villages in Kaunas County
Kėdainiai District Municipality